The Blue Ribbon Award for Best Film is a prize recognizing excellence in Japanese film. It is awarded annually by the Association of Tokyo Film Journalists as one of the Blue Ribbon Awards. Filmmakers Akira Kurosawa, Tadashi Imai and Mikio Naruse are among those who have received the award. Best Film winners Kagemusha (1980) and The Twilight Samurai (2002) also received an Academy Award nomination in the category of Best Foreign Language Film.

List of winners

References

External links
Blue Ribbon Awards on IMDb

Awards established in 1950
Recurring events established in 1950
1950 establishments in Japan
Film
Awards for best film